Same-sex marriage in the Pitcairn Islands has been legal since 14 May 2015. An ordinance to permit same-sex marriages was passed unanimously by the Island Council on 1 April 2015, and received royal assent by Governor Jonathan Sinclair on 5 May.

The Pitcairn Islands was the first civilian British Overseas Territory to legalise same-sex marriage, and the fourth to do so after Akrotiri and Dhekelia, the British Indian Ocean Territory and South Georgia and the South Sandwich Islands.

Background

The Pitcairn Islands was settled by British mutineers from HMS Bounty, along with the Tahitian men and women who were with them, in 1790. The islands were rediscovered by the British in 1814 when Captain Thomas Staines made contact with the islanders. Pitcairn Island became a British colony in 1838, and Henderson, Ducie and Oeno were annexed by the British Empire in 1902. In 1938, all four islands were incorporated into a single administrative unit.

In common law, a marriage between persons of the same sex was void ab initio. In 1866, in Hyde v Hyde and Woodmansee (a case of polygamy), Lord Penzance's judgment began: "Marriage as understood in Christendom is the voluntary union for life of one man and one woman, to the exclusion of all others." Explicit bans on same-sex marriages were enacted in England and Wales in the Nullity of Marriage Act 1971, and later the Matrimonial Causes Act 1973. Similar laws were passed in Scotland and Northern Ireland. These bans, since repealed, did not apply to the Pitcairn Islands.

The first four local ordinances having application solely to the islands were passed in 1952. One of these ordinances provided for the basis of the islands' legal system, administration and government. Two other ordinances provided for the registration of births and deaths, and for the solemnisation of marriages. The Marriage Ordinance, enacted on 16 October 1952, did not contain an explicit ban on same-sex marriage, but generally assumed married spouses to be "husband and wife".

Same-sex marriage law
On 1 April 2015, the Island Council passed the Same Sex Marriage and Civil Partnerships Ordinance by a unanimous 7–0 vote. The ordinance, supported by Mayor Shawn Christian and Deputy Mayor Brenda Christian, amended the local Marriage Ordinance to replace references to "husband and wife" with gender-neutral language and add the following definition of marriage:

The Interpretation and General Clauses Ordinance was amended to state that '"marriage" – (a) includes marriage of a same-sex couple, and (b) includes a registered civil partnership that is entered into outside of Pitcairn in accordance with the laws of that place' and '"spouse" – (a) includes a person who is married to a person of the same sex, and (b) unless otherwise specified includes a person who is a party to a registered civil partnership that is entered into outside of Pitcairn in accordance with the laws of that place'.

The ordinance was given royal assent by Governor Jonathan Sinclair on 5 May. It was published on 13 May 2015, and came into effect the following day. Both intending spouses must be 18 years or older, and one of the parties must have resided in Pitcairn for at least the past fifteen days. The marriage license is issued by the Registar of Marriages, and the marriage ceremony must take place within three months of the notice of marriage.

The move to legalise same-sex marriage was widely published on international media. Deputy Governor Kevin Lynch said that the change had been suggested by British authorities. Local resident Meralda Warren said the law "wasn't even a major point of discussion until the outside world began catching up on the news". None of the c. 50 Pitcairn Islanders residing on the island is known to be in a same-sex relationship.

See also
 LGBT rights in the Pitcairn Islands
 Same-sex marriage in the United Kingdom
 Recognition of same-sex unions in the British Overseas Territories
 Recognition of same-sex unions in Oceania

References

Pitcairn Islands
LGBT rights in the Pitcairn Islands
2015 in LGBT history
Pitcairn Islands law
Pitcairn Islands